Harald Friedrich (19 May 1947 – 29 January 2017) was a German physicist specializing in theoretical atomic physics.

Friedrich was born in Berlin and grew up in Australia. He studied physics at the University of Kiel and the University of Freiburg, and completed his doctoral studies in 1975 at the University of Münster with a dissertation on the microscopic description of the scattering of light and medium-weight nuclei. Subsequently, he was a postdoctoral student at the University of Oxford. In 1980 he habilitated as a professor at the University of Münster and was at Caltech from 1981 to 1983 on a Heisenberg scholarship. He taught at the universities of Munich and Tübingen before becoming a professor at the Technical University of Munich in 1987.

Among other institutions, he was a guest lecturer at the Institute for Theoretical Atomic Physics at the Center for Astrophysics  Harvard & Smithsonian and at the Australian National University in Canberra.

Friedrich initially dealt with theoretical nuclear physics before switching to atomic physics. In the 1980s, he studied quantum chaos phenomena in highly excited atoms and their semi-classical treatment, in part with his doctoral student Dieter Wintgen. He is also well-known through his textbook on theoretical atomic physics.

Publications 
 
 
 
 
 
 English edition: 
 .

External links 
 Homepage

1947 births
2017 deaths
20th-century German physicists
Scientists from Berlin
Academic staff of the University of Tübingen
Academic staff of the Ludwig Maximilian University of Munich
Academic staff of the Technical University of Munich
21st-century German physicists